John Robert Armstrong (1 July 1938 – September 2014) was an English footballer who played as a forward in the Football League for Darlington and in non-league football for Horden Colliery Welfare.

References

1938 births
2014 deaths
Footballers from Newcastle upon Tyne
English footballers
Association football forwards
Darlington F.C. players
Darlington Town F.C. players
English Football League players